Jere is an unincorporated community in Monongalia County, West Virginia, United States.

The community's name most likely is derived from Jeremiah.

In her efforts to improve living conditions in the area during the 1930s, First Lady Eleanor Roosevelt wrote, "I took many, many people to see this village of Jere, West Virginia, along Scott's Run, for it was a good example of what absentee ownership could do as far as human beings were concerned."

References

Unincorporated communities in Monongalia County, West Virginia
Unincorporated communities in West Virginia
Coal towns in West Virginia